Gaius Caninius Rebilus (died 12 BC) was a Roman Senator, who was appointed suffect consul in 12 BC with Lucius Volusius Saturninus as his colleague.

Biography
Caninius Rebilus was the son of Gaius Caninius Rebilus, suffect consul in 45 BC. A member of the Quindecimviri, he was listed for a suffect consulship in 11 BC. However, in 12 BC he was appointed suffect consul, replacing Valgius Rufus. He died while still serving in office. His son was probably Gaius Caninius Rebilus, the suffect consul of AD 37.

Sources
 Syme, Ronald, The Augustan Aristocracy (1986) Clarendon Press

References

1st-century BC Romans
12 BC deaths
Senators of the Roman Empire
Suffect consuls of Imperial Rome
Rebilus, Gaius
Year of birth unknown